Frederick F. Faris (1870–1927) was a Wheeling, West Virginia-based architect.

Life and career
Frederick Fisher Faris was born August 1, 1870, in St. Clairsville, Ohio to Joseph Anderson Faris, an artist, and Mary Elizabeth (Pratt) Faris. The family moved east to Wheeling when he was two years old. He was educated in the public schools, and after finishing high school joined the office of Edgar W. Wells, architect for Klieves, Kraft & Company, as a student.
 He later worked for architects in Chicago and New York City before returning to Wheeling in 1892. That year he formed a partnership with Joseph Leiner, known as Leiner & Faris. This was dissolved in 1894 when Faris joined Edward B. Franzheim and Millard F. Giesey to form Franzheim, Giesey & Faris. Franzheim withdrew in 1899, but the firm continued as Giesey & Faris until 1911. Faris then worked in private practice until his death sixteen years later. In 1924 Faris was joined by his nephew, Frederic Faris, who succeeded to the practice at his death. The younger Faris practiced until own his sudden death in 1964.

He designed a variety of residential, commercial, and educational buildings. Among the buildings he designed were the Schmulbach Building, the tallest building in Wheeling, and the Market Auditorium, then the longest building. Other notable buildings include the Wheeling Electric Company, the First National Bank of West Virginia, the Wheeling Intelligencer, the former public library, the Scottish Rite Cathedral, and numerous schools including the Triadelphia Junior High School and Madison School. He also designed Mount Carmel Monastery (1917).

Faris served one term in the West Virginia House of Delegates in 1913.

Personal life and death
Faris was married in 1897 to Nellie Egerter. They had no children. Faris died June 20, 1927, from strep throat at the age of 56. He was buried at Greenwood Cemetery in Wheeling.

Legacy
At the time of his death he was known as the "dean of Wheeling architects." Several of his works have been listed on the United States National Register of Historic Places, and others contribute to listed historic districts.

Selected works
Buildings built between 1892 and 1894 are attributed to Leiner & Faris, between 1894 and 1899 to Franzheim, Giesey & Faris, between 1899 and 1911 to Giesey & Faris, between 1911 and 1927 to Frederick F. Faris and after 1927 to Frederic Faris.

 Bank of Wheeling Building, 1229 Main St, Wheeling, West Virginia (1892, demolished)
 Vance Memorial Presbyterian Church, 905 National Rd, Wheeling, West Virginia (1896–97)
 First United Methodist Church, 118 Clarksburg St, Mannington, West Virginia (1898)
 George M. Snook house, 1315 National Rd, Wheeling, West Virginia (1898, demolished)
 Mannington Public School, 113 Clarksburg St, Mannington, West Virginia (1902)
 Schmulbach Building, 1134 Market St, Wheeling, West Virginia (1904–07)
 Wheeling Country Club (former), 100 Kensington Dr, Wheeling, West Virginia (1905)
 Harry Paull house, 1312 Pleasant Ave, Wellsburg, West Virginia (1907–11, NRHP 1986)
 St. John's United Church of Christ (former), 41 22nd St, Wheeling, West Virginia (1907–08)
 Sumner Jones house, 8 Kenwood Pl, Wheeling, West Virginia (1908)
 George Rentsch house, 228 Carmel Rd, Wheeling, West Virginia (1910)
 YMCA Building, 32 20th St, Wheeling, West Virginia (1910)
 Laconia Building, 1144 Market St, Wheeling, West Virginia (1911)
 YWCA Building, 1100 Chapline St, Wheeling, West Virginia (1913–15)
 Mount Carmel Monastery, 102 Carmel Rd, Wheeling, West Virginia (1915–17)
 Wagner Building, 2001 Main St, Wheeling, West Virginia (1915)
 Madison School, 91 Zane St, Wheeling, West Virginia (1916)
 Scottish Rite Cathedral, 83 14th St, Wheeling, West Virginia (1916)
 Triadelphia High School (former), 1636 National Rd, Wheeling, West Virginia (1917–19)
 Shaw Hall, West Liberty University, West Liberty, West Virginia (1919–20, NRHP 1996)
 Shotwell Hall, West Liberty University, West Liberty, West Virginia (1936–37, NRHP 1996)
 City–County Building, 1500 Chapline St, Wheeling, West Virginia (1960)

Notes

References

1870 births
1927 deaths
Architects from Ohio
Architects from West Virginia
19th-century American architects
20th-century American architects
Burials at Greenwood Cemetery (Wheeling, West Virginia)
People from St. Clairsville, Ohio
People from Wheeling, West Virginia